Gidi Up is a Nigerian drama television and web series created by Jadesola Osiberu and executively produced by Lola Odedina. It is produced by Ndani TV and sponsored by GTBank. Episodes are first aired online through Ndani TV, and first aired on television via DStv's Africa Magic Showcase. Online broadcast of Gidi Up'''s first episode was on 20 February 2013 and the first television broadcast was on 13 July 2014.

The series which is mainly set in Lagos, follows the lives of four young adults (Obi, Tokunbo, Eki and Yvonne) who are pursuing success and independence in the city of Lagos, and the challenges they are faced with at every step of the way in their quest to achieve their dreams. The word "Gidi", from the title "Gidi Up''", is culled from the popular term "Las Gidi" (often shortened as "Gidi") which can be translated as "Real Lagos", and is used in referring to the city of Lagos.

The first season of the series was an eight-part web miniseries, with a length of four to eight minutes per episode and used to be broadcast only online, but the second Season was converted into a 30-minute episodial television and webseries, with the first season combined and aired on television as the pilot episode for season 2. There was also a change in the actors playing the lead characters for the second season; OC Ukeje replaced Karibi Fubura for the Obi character, Titilope Sonuga replaced Oreka Godis for Eki, while Adesua Etomi replaced KC Ejelonu for the character of Sharon.

Series overview

Episodes

Season 1 (2013)

Season 2 (2014)

References

Gidi Up
Gidi Up